Regina Centre is a former provincial electoral division in the Canadian province of Saskatchewan, created in the redistribution prior to the 1967 election out of parts of Regina West and Regina North.  It was abolished prior to the 2003 general election and is now part of Regina Elphinstone-Centre.  It was the riding of Premier Allan Blakeney.

1967 Provincial election:  Regina Centre 

 Elected.
X Incumbent.

1971 Provincial election:  Regina Centre 

 Elected.
X Incumbent.

1975 Provincial election:  Regina Centre 

 Elected.
X Incumbent.

References 
 Saskatchewan Archives - Election Results by Electoral Division

Former provincial electoral districts of Saskatchewan